The Darkness (Jackie Estacado) is a fictional superhero created by Marc Silvestri, Garth Ennis and David Wohl, who first appeared in an American comic series published by Top Cow Productions in 1996. The character first appeared in Witchblade #10 (Nov. 1996), set in the Image Universe. Jackie Estacado is a New York mafioso who, after turning 21, inherited the curse of the Darkness.

Top Cow relaunched The Darkness comic title in 2019 with Matt Hawkins as writer and Tom Grindberg as artist, featuring Jackie Estacado and Sara Pezzini in supporting roles.

Fictional biography

Darkness
In the Top Cow Universe, the Darkness is depicted as a cosmic entity predating recorded history. It is the embodiment of the empty void of chaos that existed prior to the coming of God's light – embodied as the Angelus. As the cosmos formed in its place, the now-usurped Darkness grew to resent God and His creation. Growing powerful enough to manifest itself and conjure a legion of demons, the Darkness declared war upon the Angelus and her host. This lasted for eons until a truce was found to prevent mutual destruction. To seal the covenant, the two powers mated and conceived the Witchblade.

Sometime after this, the Darkness began inhabiting human vessels – inherited through the sons of its chosen bloodline; the father passing the curse to his child at the moment of conception, expiring as the force leaves his body. The power then awakens on the son's 21st birthday. A wielder of the Darkness has been present in every major time period and continental power in history. These hosts have usually been of a violent predisposition, such as dictators and warlords. Many have also been of a criminal background, namely murderers, thieves, and abusers.

Later in the story, the writers invented other cosmic powers, so far 13, known as "Artifacts".

Jackie Estacado
Jackie Estacado was the vessel of the Darkness for the first run of the series. He is depicted as a brutalized version of the classical anti-hero; oft-aligned with evil, but sometimes fighting with remorse and wanting to do good. The key to his personality the writers give is "My whole life I've been kicked around, you know? I don't know how to do anything but kick back".

Raised as a hit-man for the Franchetti Family Mob, Jackie's defining quality was his penchant for murder as well as womanizing. Despite his criminal lifestyle, Jackie followed a strict code of morals. Chief among his beliefs was a trust in those who earned it and a fierce loyalty to family and allies. Early in the series, his main love interest was his childhood friend Jenny Romano. He later developed a romance with Sara Pezzini after the birth of their daughter, Hope Pezzini.

The son of notorious Mob associate Danny Estacado and an unnamed prostitute, Jackie was taken in by Saint Gerald's Orphanage where he was frequently abused by the orderlies. Despite his antisocial nature even as a boy, Jackie protected his friend Jenny from their cruel treatment. At the age of six, Jackie was adopted by upcoming Mob boss Frankie "Kill-The-Children-Too" Franchetti, claiming to be his uncle. He only did so after being persuaded by Sonatine of the Brotherhood of Darkness that bringing Jackie into his inner circle would make Frankie powerful.

Life in the Mob provided Jackie both with a home as well as a sense of safety and family, but also made him more violent and prone to illegal activity. Losing his virginity at age fourteen to a female officer during interrogation, he disregarded the law and developed a sex habit. Making his first hit at age sixteen, Jackie soon became Frankie's chief enforcer; skyrocketing the Franchetti's into one of the top Mob families in New York City and fulfilling Sonatine's prophecy. Living a playboy lifestyle, Jackie would often visit Jenny's club to keep in touch.

Both the Angelus and Sonatine kept vigil over the course of Jackie's life; both of them waiting for him to manifest the Darkness - the Brotherhood wishing to exploit his power for their own ends while the Angelus wished only to annihilate the wielder while at his most vulnerable. Jackie was also being watched by followers of the Church of the Angelus which had infiltrated various criminal operations in opposition to Franchetti's. Among them was Regis Tyne, a Mob accountant who would associate with Jackie and attempt to assassinate him over a decade later.

When he turned 21, his dark powers awakened, and he learned of his evil heritage. Jackie spent much of his time escaping from or fighting the Angelus, Sonatine, and the Brotherhood of the Darkness. Jackie tried to quit the mob, but Frankie kidnapped and killed Jenny, a childhood friend of Jackie's. Jackie, in a warehouse showdown with Franchetti's crew, blew up the warehouse, killing Frankie and burning Jackie alive.

Jackie spent two days afterward wandering around Hell while searching for Jenny until the former priest Tom Judge, bearer of another artifact called "the Rapture", came and gave him hope, a gift that allows men to exit Hell. Jackie's body was then reconstructed by the Darkness.

Jackie returned to find the Franchetti mob taken over by Frankie's cousin, Paulie. Paulie was able to discover Jackie's secret, and Paulie blackmailed Jackie into doing hits for him. Along the way, Jackie learned how to construct a gun out of the Darkness. Later, Jackie turns on Paulie and takes control of the Franchetti family, eventually taking on the Triads, and fighting the Russian Mafia in Atlantic City, where he is seduced by a woman created by his own unconscious. Siding with the Magdalena (the bearer of another artifact, the Spear of Destiny), he confronts the Angelus.

After a devastating attack of the Angelus army on the Franchetti family, Jackie learns from an Angelus warrior, that detective Sara Pezzini, former bearer of the Witchblade, is pregnant and that he is the father of the unborn baby. The reason is that the Darkness, getting tired of the truce between the Light and the Darkness, mind-controlling Jackie to unknowingly having sex with Sara while she was in coma, using him in a way that he does not die fathering the baby. Calculating "whoever has the baby, wins the war", the Angelus tries to get the baby. Jackie and Danielle Baptiste, the new bearer of the Witchblade, defend Sara from an attack of the Angelus army and get her to a safe house in a cavern. The Angelus army attacks again, defeats Jackie and the Magdalena, but they buy Sara and Dani enough time to complete the birth of Saras daughter. Sara dies in the process, but her daughter (or the Witchblade) brings her to life again, giving her half of the power of the Witchblade, Dani keeping the other half. The Angelus defeats Sara and Dani, but is vanquished by the Baby. Sara names her daughter Hope.

Some months before Jackie met the chemical engineer Professor Kirchner, who helped him to develop his darkness abilities through an improved focus and scientific knowledge. After the annihilation of the Franchetti Family, Jackie abandons the Mafia life and usurps the power in a South American country, the banana republic Sierra Muñoz, in hopes of establishing a new empire there. Jackie established a drug cartel in Sierra Muñoz with a Darkness-based narcotic made from his own bodily fluids, built an impenetrable fortress, formed an army of improved darklings and a lover, not knowing Kirchner controls her. The residents of Sierra Muñoz resisted Jackie's takeover with the help of the U.S. Department of Defense, which wanted to capture Jackie for experimentation and to learn about his armor and weapons. He defeats them, but Kirchner and his pregnant lover turn against him, and she takes control of the Darkness, taking it from him. Left dying, Jackie regains the Darkness by pure willforce. Confronting Kirchner, he learns that the "Baby" is already born, and that it is the incarnation of the Darkness on the earthly plane that the Darkness sought for generations, without human "flaws" like conscience. It attacks him, but Jackie defeats it.

Having almost lost the connection to the Darkness at the end of this fight, Jackie heads back to the United States, surviving an encounter with a dream-stealing witch in Mexico. He is captured by a devil named the Sovereign. He tells Jackie that following the battle with his Darkness offspring, he died, and his soul was cast into Hell, leaving his body on Earth, reconstructed by the feeble rest of Darkness power he maintained. Jackie made a deal with the Sovereign, who promises, in return for several assassinations, to reunite Jackie's body and soul. Jackie fulfills the Sovereign's demands, including killing a demonically possessed nun, an immortal drug dealer, and a 10-year-old African warlord.

In between he finds time to visit New York, where he punishes some thugs of the Franchetti mob who caused the death of a 5-year-old girl, visits Sara and his daughter, where two more artifacts are introduced, the antagonists Glacier Stone and Ember Stone, our heroes learn that there is a total of 13 artifacts, Jackie kills the current bearer of the Angelus and has his first kiss with Sara. The new bearer of the Glacier Stone, and also another artifact, the Sword of Blood, is Michael Finnigan, a small time Irish mobster Jackie hired to watch over Sara and Hope; some months after this he saves Jackie, who was captured by a revenge driven Egyptian mob.

Jackie's mission for the Sovereign takes an unexpected turn when he encounters a woman with a red ribbon who captures his attention. He is intrigued and can't resist the urge to find out more about her. He also meets a past Darkness wielder named Aram, also known as the Foreigner, who explains that the Sovereign has been manipulating Jackie from the start and that both his soul and the Darkness are still within him, merely repressed by his will and desire to be free of the Darkness's influence. Ignoring the Foreigner, Jackie follows the woman and finds himself facing against a resurrected Djinn created by a shaman specifically to kill Darkness wielders. Finding the Djinn to be virtually invincible, Jackie is guided to strangle the woman to death with her own ribbon, breaking the curse of the Djinn and freeing the woman from her eternal servitude. Jackie is confronted by Aram, who further intimidates him into finally summoning the full power of the Darkness once again. Aram disappears, leaving Jackie with the realization of the Sovereign's manipulations and fully intent on revenge with full control of his powers.

Seeking Revenge, Jackie attacks the Sovereign, chases him away from his base and conquers it for himself. He finds a list of statues of the Sovereign; to destroy all of them he gathers a crew of thieves, smugglers and fighters, beginning with Leonard Kim, one surviving member of the Sovereigns mercenaries. During this campaign he confronts a swamp monster guarding a temple. Later he has to deal with the US army guarding Fort Knox and escapes from a team of hunter killers of the government - with the help of an army officer who decides, that Jackies abilities should not be replicated. After that he walks in a trap a Russian mafioso build for him with the help of a traitor in his own team, luring him with images of his sister Capris; he escapes from a machine that feeds on his magic energy. Next, he has to deal with a second traitor in his team, mob accountant Regis Tyne, a sleeper agent of a fanatical human Angelus army - who decides not to kill Jackie because there could be worse bearers to the Darkness, without the elements of conscience and loyalty he sees in Jackie, but is killed in the next instant by a surprised Jackie who thinks he has to react fast. He revives the agent with the help of the Darkness, now controlling him, hears his story and let him continue as part of the crew. In the last confrontation with the Sovereign, Jackie and his team, the letter ensnared in the illusion spells of the Sovereign, win because of Leonard Kims sensibility (he can shake of his illusion because there was only wealth, but no human relations) and sacrifice, destroying the last, but poisoning statue of the Sovereign. Leonard declines Jackies offer to heal him with the Darkness.

Powers and abilities
Jackie held the powers of the Darkness, an elemental force of chaos and creation. The core of a Darkness wielder's abilities is their accessing of an otherworldly dimension through the shadows around them and exerting control over the countless demonic creatures that dwell there. These creatures – called Darklings – usually appear as serpentine or goblinoid fiends which cause mischief and murder on behalf of their host and can communicate with their master through telepathy. They possess supernatural strength and stamina as well as deadly claws and fangs.

In terms of individual prowess, Darklings are quite versatile in terms of their physique and purpose, emerging in different forms depending on the intentions or needs of their host. While they share the aforementioned traits, some Darklings have wings and others can breathe fire. Darklings have also exhibited the ability to easily adhere to sheer surfaces as well as teleporting through shadows with their bearer and even producing corrosive chemicals through their saliva or excrement. While beholden to their vessel, Darklings do exhibit their own autonomy.

When in a battle, Darkness wielders envelop their whole bodies in a mystical armor of shadowy metal. This gives them strength and durability beyond that of their creatures as well as razored fingers and bladed tendrils emerging from their shoulders which can transform into wings. With time and practice, the wielder can completely alter the visage of their armor in order to shapeshift their own appearance into someone else for a time. They can also instinctively fashion weapons and shields from their armor in a similar fashion as bearers of the Witchblade.

Wielders of the Darkness exhibit a potent healing factor when injured - the shadows surrounding them absorbed into their body to regenerate cells at unnatural rates, even to the extent of regrowing lost limbs and reconstructing whole portions of the body that have been destroyed. This renders the vessels effectively impervious to disease and poisons as well as resistance to supernatural afflictions such as the powers of the Horsemen of the Apocalypse. This also allows them a degree of pseudo-immortality as the Darkness keeps them preserved over millennia.

Any other uses of the Darkness are limited only by the imagination of the wielder.

In addition to the curse, Darkness bearers are typically hardened individuals whose lives have endowed them with considerable fighting prowess and survival skills. Wielders from older time periods were usually skilled swordsmen while modern hosts like Jackie are skilled marksmen. Individual wielders might also have personal skills. Jackie was trained in chemistry by Kirchner - enabling him to convert Darkness-borne material into water, corrosives, or a narcotic. Ambitious hosts usually climb to positions of rank; overseeing armies, domains, or businesses.

Significant characters

Angelus
The Angelus is the antithesis of the Darkness and a common enemy in the series. Jackie's first confrontation with the entity ended with him as the victor. Sonatine would later conjure the spirit in hopes of it possessing Appolonia Franchetti in their mutual desire to take vengeance on Estacado. Instead, it inhabited the body of the latter's catatonic mother, Lauren. Jackie managed to escape this encounter by creating a doppelganger of himself from the Darkness. This new Angelus would seek sanctuary in the Amazon where she would encounter then-Magdalena, Sister Mariella.
Returning some time after Frankie's death, the Angelus would again seek out Jackie - now Don of the Franchetti Mafia. At the same time, the newest Magdalena - Patience - was assigned to assassinate Jackie. During her hunt, she encountered the Angelus and followed her to Estacado. As Patience subdued Jackie, the Angelus took advantage and attacked. He was able to lure her into a tunnel to weaken her enough for Appolonia to kill her with the Spear of Destiny. The power then possessed Patience for only a few moments before being exorcised through sheer will.

Appolonia Franchetti
The daughter of Frankie and Lauren Franchetti and Jackie's adoptive cousin. When she was a child, she witness her father brutally torture and murder her mother's lover. The trauma of this experience led to Appolonia's resentment of Frankie as well as her own antisocial behaviors. Growing up with Jackie, they both grew to hate each other; him for Franchetti's attention and her for her petty cruelty. Estacado was Frankie's golden boy while he more or less ignored Appolonia and her now-catatonic mother. She eventually left New York to study abroad in Europe.
Appolonia returned to the States shortly after Jackie inherited the Darkness. Bent on revenge and determined to take over the Franchetti Family without Estacado, she had Wenders kidnapped and tortured until he revealed everything he knew about Jackie, his powers, and the Angelus. Collaborating with Sonatine, she planned to become the next Angelus host. This plan misfired when the spirit inhabited her mother instead. She was left in a coma following this encounter and was only resuscitated back to consciousness by the severed blade of the Spear of Destiny.

Aram
The oldest recorded host of the Darkness, Aram the Witch-King was a sovereign and warlock of Ancient Africa some ten thousand years prior to the Common Era. Willingly letting the curse into his body, he used its power to take entire regions of land to sate his lust for conquest. At some point after becoming disgusted with his cruelty, he used his mastery of sorcery to exorcise the Darkness from his body. Although effectively free from the curse, the Darkness condemned him with immortality; promising that he would wander the Earth until he let it back in.
Over the centuries, Aram - known by then only as the Foreigner - would travel the globe watching over Darkness hosts from a distance. At some point in the course of his trek, he would encounter and slay a djinn created to kill Darkness bearers and would also outwit the Sovereign.

Capris Castiglione
Jackie's twin sister and a minor ally in the first volume of the series and later a primary antagonist in or around the last volume. Separated from her sibling at birth, Capris inherited only a small portion of the Darkness's power - being one of the only women to bear the curse. Raised by Father Brendan, Capris lived an idyllic life. This all ended after her 18th birthday when she found her longtime friend and college roommate - Blaire Dray - dead from an apparent suicide. It's soon found out that Blaire was murdered as cover for an illegal porn racket.
Capris made her last appearance in the Outer Darkness storyline, where it was revealed that she had become fully seduced by the euphoric power of the Darkness and had been training and perfecting her powers. The Darkness chose her to be his new host and used her to try to kill Jackie. She attacked and overpowered him with her superior powers and would have killed him if not for Aram using his last bit of magic to shut down the Darkness. Jackie killed Capris using a magical crystal glove given to him by Aram. She is last seen as a damned soul in a strange afterlife for Darkness-wielders.
While she did manifest Darkness powers upon turning 21, Capris's abilities were significantly less than those of her brother when she first appeared in the series. She seemed to function as a repository of power which Jackie drew on during their encounter with the Cherub Hostile. She initially only showcased increased strength and resilience as well as the ability to conjure tendrils from the surrounding shadows. Over a decade later, her powers expanded exponentially to the point of manifesting her own armor and creating zombies by feeding them her blood.

Sonatine
The leader of the Brotherhood of Darkness and a recurring antagonist early in the series. Having followed Jackie's bloodline since the days of their founder - Miguel Estacado - Sonatine was obsessed with remaking the world in the image he desired using the powers of the Darkness. Sonatine first met Jackie after he manifested the curse. While initially presenting himself as a mentor, Jackie's refusal led to the Brotherhood kidnapping Jenny to force his cooperation. However, this plan backfired when the Angelus arrived, and they were forced to work together.
Sonatine's knowledge of the occult allowed him a degree of arcane ability and a prolonged lifespan. He carried a star talisman that compelled people to believe anything he said or to answer any question truthfully. It could also create light powerful enough to frighten Darklings. He was also schooled in ceremonial magic and possession. These were showcased when he ritualistically conjured the presence of the Angelus in an attempt to enslave its power, and later after being gravely wounded he transferred his consciousness into one of his servants, Wenders.

Sovereign
The Sovereign was the Emperor of Rome roughly three thousand years prior to the Common Era. His reign was short-lived as he and his family were murdered by a bearer of the Darkness. Sentenced to Hell for his cruelties in life, he managed to deceive an angel into freeing his soul. Bargaining with the Fates to be spared an eternity of torture, he became a custodian of souls sent to Hell. Able to enter the living world only by possessing statues made in his image, the Sovereign became obsessed with taking revenge of any vessel of the Darkness he encountered.

Jenny Romano
The childhood friend and girlfriend of Jackie.

Frankie Franchetti
Frankie is one of the main antagonists of the series and a vicious mobster.

Capris Castiglione
Jackie's twin sister.

The Magdalena
Descended from Mary Magdalene and Jesus Christ, The Magdalena is an assassin born and bred to serve the Vatican in times of duress.

Nino Wenders
A manservant of the Darkness working for Sontaine, who Jackie forces to help him battle the Angelus. He later becomes romantically obsessed with Jackie, who regards Wenders as cowardly and untrustworthy.

Angelus Warriors
Servants of the Angeleous.

Elle
An artificial human who becomes Jackie's companion.

The Foreigner/Aman The Witch-King
An ancient wielder of the Darkness that was able to get rid of it through meditation and years of internal struggle.

Paulie Franchetti
The cousin of Frankie Franchetti and the Don of the Franchetti crime family after Jackie kills his cousin. Paulie is a vicious psychopath who has no morals, empathy, or regard for the lives of others. He has an extremely short temper, engaging in brutal retaliation against even the slightest offense.

The Brotherhood
A cult who worships the Darkness.

Captain Eddie Shrote
A deeply corrupt police captain in the NYPD and a business partner of Paulie Franchetti. Shrote is a ruthless sociopath who, in Jackie's words, lives to exploit others. He commands a large precinct with hundreds of patrol officers and a platoon of New York ESU officers, many of whom are corrupt or psychotic, using them to do his dirty work.

Collected editions
The series has been collected into a series of trade paperbacks:

Volume 1 (1996–2001):
 Coming of Age (176 pages, collects The Darkness preview and The Darkness #1–6, 1998)
 Ultimate Collection (352 pages, collects The Darkness #1–6 and #40, Volume 2 #1–6, 2007)
 Heart of Darkness (144 pages, collects The Darkness #7–8, 11–14, 2001)
 Spear of Destiny (106 pages, collects The Darkness #15–18, 2000)
 Original Sin (166 pages, collects The Darkness #15–25, 2005)
 Flesh and Blood (464 pages, collects The Darkness #26–39, October 2005)
 Compendium (1280 pages, collects The Darkness #1–40, Tales of the Darkness #1–4 and Darkness: Wanted Dead, December 2006, November 2007)
 Origins Volume 1 (176 pages, collects #½-6)
 Origins Volume 2 (176 pages, collects #7-10, Witchblade issues #18–19)
 Origins Volume 3 (208 pages, collects #11–18)
 Origins Volume 4 (176 pages, collects #19–25)
Volume 2 (2002–2005):
 Resurrection (176 pages, collects The Darkness Volume 1 #40, Volume 2 #1–6, 2004)
 Demon Inside (272 pages, collects The Darkness #7–16 and Darkness: Wanted Dead, January 2007)
 Depths Of Hell (224 pages, collects The Darkness #17–24, September 2007)
The Darkness Vs. Eva – Daughter of Dracula (104 pages, collects The Darkness Vs. Eva #1–4, 2008)
Top Cow/Marvel: The Crossover Collection Vol. 1 (304 pages, collects Devil's Reign #1–8, Wolverine/Witchblade, The Hulk/The Darkness)
DC/Top Cow Crossovers (200 pages, collects The Darkness/Batman, The Darkness/Superman, JLA/Cyberforce & JLA/Witchblade)
Unholy Union (Marvel Comics crossover: featuring the Hulk, the Darkness, Ghost Rider, Witchblade, & Dr. Strange).
First Born (160 pages, First Born #0–3)
Broken Trinity (208 pages, Broken Trinity #1–3, The Darkness one-shot, Angelus one-shot, Witchblade one-shot)
 Compendium 2 (collects The Darkness #41–89, The Darkness: Lodbrok's Hand one-shot, The Darkness: Shadows And Flame one-shot, The Darkness: Butcher one-shot)
Volume 3 (2008–2012):
 Accursed: Volume 1 (160 pages, collects The Darkness #1–6, September 2008)
 Accursed: Volume 2 (140 pages, collects The Darkness #7–10, 75 October 2009)
 Accursed: Volume 3 (160 pages, collects The Darkness #76–79 and Tales of the Darkness: Lodbrok's Hand one-shot, June 2010)
 Accursed: Volume 4 (172 pages, collects The Darkness #80–84 and The Darkness: Shadows and Flame one-shot, December 2010)
 Accursed: Volume 5 (160 pages, collects The Darkness #85–89, November 2011)
 Accursed: Volume 6 (160 pages, collects The Darkness #90–95, March 2012)
 Accursed: Volume 7 (160 pages, collects The Darkness #96–100, April 2012)
Rebirth (2012–2013)
 Rebirth: Volume 1 (160 pages, collects The Darkness #101–105, September 2012)
 Rebirth: Volume 2 (160 pages, collects The Darkness #106–111, April 2013)
 Progeny (160 pages, collects Artifacts #25–26, Witchblade #164–165, and The Darkness #111, August 2013)
 Rebirth: Volume 3 (160 pages, collects The Darkness #112–116, February 2014)

In other media

Film
In December 2004, Dimension Films paid an undisclosed six-figure sum to develop a movie based on the comic, with a planned release for 2008. The film rights were later sold to the Pang brothers in December 2005.

At Comic-Con 2009, Top Cow president Matt Hawkins revealed that a live-action The Darkness film was in development, with Scott Stuber Productions attached as the producer for the project. In 2012, Len Wiseman signed on to produce the movie.

Video games

A game based on The Darkness was released for the PlayStation 3 on June 20, 2007, and for the Xbox 360 eight days later. Developed by Starbreeze Studios and published by 2K Games, the game follows a differing version of the story and gives more characterization to the Darkness.

A sequel, titled The Darkness II, was released for the PC, the Xbox 360 and the PlayStation 3 on February 7, 2012, developed by Digital Extremes and published by 2K Games.

References

External links

1996 comics debuts
Characters created by Garth Ennis
Characters created by Marc Silvestri
Comics adapted into video games
Image Comics characters with accelerated healing
Image Comics characters with superhuman strength
Comics set in New York City
Fictional assassins in comics
Fictional characters who can manipulate darkness or shadows
Fictional demons and devils
Fictional gunfighters in comics
Fictional mass murderers
Fictional Italian American people
Fictional gangsters
Fictional orphans
Image Comics superheroes
Top Cow titles
Witchblade characters